Rick H. Eckstein (born March 4, 1973) is an American professional baseball hitting coach. He is a hitting coach and the former hitting coach for Washington Nationals and Pittsburgh Pirates of Major League Baseball (MLB) and the Kentucky Wildcats baseball team, and assistant hitting coach and scout for the Los Angeles Angels of Anaheim of MLB.

Career
Eckstein is an alumnus of the University of Florida. Eckstein became the hitting coach for the Washington Nationals of Major League Baseball in September 2008, after serving as the Columbus Clippers hitting coach. He also was the hitting coach on the United States national baseball team in the 2008 Olympics.

On November 5, 2013, Eckstein was named to the Los Angeles Angels of Anaheim coaching staff for the 2014 season. On August 14, 2014, Eckstein left the Angels to join the staff of Gary Henderson at the University of Kentucky. He was the minor league hitting coordinator for the Minnesota Twins organization for the 2017 and 2018 seasons.

The Pittsburgh Pirates hired Eckstein as their hitting coach after the 2018 season. On August 30, 2021, after nearly 3 seasons as hitting coach, the Pirates fired Eckstein.

Personal life
He is the older brother of former major leaguer David Eckstein. On December 8, 2010, Eckstein donated his right kidney to his brother, Ken, who is currently suffering from a renal disease.

References

External links

1973 births
Living people
Baseball coaches from Florida
Baseball players from Florida
Kentucky Wildcats baseball coaches
Major League Baseball hitting coaches
Medalists at the 2008 Summer Olympics
Pittsburgh Pirates coaches
Sportspeople from Sanford, Florida
University of Florida alumni
United States national baseball team people
Washington Nationals coaches